(6 August 1972 – 27 March 2019) was a Japanese tattoo artist and musician who gained fame from his appearances in the TLC reality show Miami Ink.

References

External links
Biography at TLC Miami Ink Web site
Yoji Harada on Myspace
Ruthless and Toothless official site

1972 births
2019 deaths
Japanese tattoo artists
Japanese emigrants to the United States
People with acquired American citizenship
Artists from Miami
People from Tokyo

sv:Yojiro Harada